was a town located in Iishi District, Shimane Prefecture, Japan.

As of 2003, the town had an estimated population of 3,372 and a density of 28.58 persons per km². The total area was 117.98 km².

On January 1, 2005, Akagi, along with the town of Tonbara (also from Iishi District), was merged to create the town of Iinan.

External links
Official website of Iinan 

Dissolved municipalities of Shimane Prefecture
Populated places established in 1957
Populated places disestablished in 2005
1957 establishments in Japan
2005 disestablishments in Japan